The Rainy River is a short river of the northeastern Marlborough Region of New Zealand's South Island. It flows north from the Richmond Range into the Pelorus River, which it reaches five kilometres west of Pelorus Bridge.

References

Rivers of the Marlborough Region
Rivers of New Zealand